ESB may refer to:

Education 
 École supérieure du bois, a French engineering College
 Edwards School of Business, at the University of Saskatchewan in Canada
 English Speaking Board, a British educational charity
 ESB Business School, at Reutlingen University in Germany
 European School, Bergen, in the Netherlands

Sport 
 E.S.B. (horse), a racehorse
 Elias Sports Bureau, a North American statistical and historical sports information organisation
 Entente Sportive de Bingerville, an Ivorian football club

Other uses 
 Basque Socialist Party
 The E Street Band, an American rock band primarily associated with Bruce Springsteen
 Enterprise service bus, a computer software abstraction layer
 ESB Group, a multinational energy group based in Ireland
 Electric Ireland, formerly ESB Customer Supply, an Irish electricity supplier
 The Empire Strikes Back, a 1980 film in the Star Wars series
 Equilibrium partitioning sediment benchmark
 Ankara Esenboğa Airport, serving Ankara, Turkey
 Expert Soldier Badge, a proposed badge of the US Army
 Extra special bitter, a style of ale
 Fuller's ESB, an extra special bitter ale
 Electric Storage Battery Company, now Exide, an American battery manufacturer
Empire State Building, a skyscraper in New York City
Expeditionary Mobile Base, a ship type designation for the US Navy
European Union's, abbreviation in Icelandic